Zarabad-e Sharqi Rural District is a rural district (dehestan) in Zarabad District, Konarak County, Sistan and Baluchestan province, Iran. At the 2006 census, its population was 6,495, in 1,362 families.  The rural district has 31 villages.

References 

Rural Districts of Sistan and Baluchestan Province
Konarak County